Democratic Change Party may refer to:
 Democratic Change (South Sudan)
 Democratic Change (El Salvador)
 Democratic Change (Panama)
 Alliance for Democratic Change, Tanzania